Beryl Cook, OBE (10 September 192628 May 2008) was a British artist best known for her original and instantly recognisable paintings. Often comical, her works pictured people whom she encountered in everyday life, including people enjoying themselves in pubs, girls shopping or out on a hen night, drag queen shows or a family picnicking by the seaside or abroad. She had no formal training and did not take up painting until her thirties. She was a shy and private person, and in her art often depicted the flamboyant and extrovert characters so different to herself.

Cook admired the work of the English artist Stanley Spencer, his influence evident in her compositions and bold bulky figures. Another influence was Edward Burra, who painted sleazy cafés, nightclubs, gay bars, sailors and prostitutes, although, unlike Burra, she did not paint the sinister aspects of scenes. She had an almost photographic memory. Although widely popular and recognised as one of the most well-known contemporary British artists, Cook never enjoyed acceptance by the art establishment.

Since her death in 2008, Beryl's son John and granddaughter Sophie have run the official Beryl Cook website providing a look into her life.

Biography

Beryl Francis Lansley was born in Egham, Surrey, as one of four sisters. Her parents, Adrian S. B. Lansley and Ella Farmer-Francis, separated very early and her mother moved to Reading, Berkshire with her daughters. Beryl attended Kendrick School there, but left education at fourteen and started to work in a variety of jobs. Having moved to London towards the end of the Second World War, Beryl attempted working as a model and showgirl. In 1948, she married her childhood friend John Cook, who was in the merchant navy. When he retired from the sea, they briefly ran a pub in Stoke-by-Nayland, Suffolk. Their son John was born in 1950, and in 1956, the family left to live in Southern Rhodesia (now known as Zimbabwe). They remained in Africa for the next decade, where in 1960 Cook produced her first painting, Hangover.

The family returned to England in the mid-sixties and moved to East Looe, Cornwall in 1965, where Beryl focused more on her painting. They then moved to Plymouth in 1968, where they bought a guest house on the Hoe. Cook shared her time between running the guest house and producing ever more paintings. In the mid-seventies, her works caught the attention of one of their guests, who put her in touch with the management of the Plymouth Arts Centre, where her first exhibition took place in November 1975. The exhibition was a great success and resulted in a cover feature in The Sunday Times. This was followed by an exhibition at the Portal Gallery in London in 1976, where Cook continued to exhibit regularly until her death.

Cook enjoyed growing popularity and her paintings soon were in great demand. Her first book of collected works was published by John Murray in 1978, and in 1979 a film was made for LWT's The South Bank Show where she discussed her work with Melvyn Bragg. Cook collaborated with such authors as Edward Lucie-Smith and Nanette Newman by providing illustrations for their books. She continued regularly to publish books of her own artworks until the early 2000s, such as Beryl Cook's New York (1985) which had been inspired by her three week visit to New York City in 1983.

In 1994, she received the Best Selling Published Artist Award from the Fine Art Trade Guild. In 1995 she was awarded the Order of the British Empire. She did not attend the official ceremony due to her shyness, and accepted the honour at a quieter ceremony in Plymouth the following year. The Royal Mail reproduced one of her paintings as a first class postage stamp. In 2002, her painting The Royal Couple featured in the Golden Jubilee exhibition in London. Tiger Aspect Productions made two animated films called Bosom Pals using characters from her paintings, voiced by Dawn French, Rosemary Leach, Alison Steadman and Timothy Spall, and broadcast in February 2004. Channel 4 News produced a short film on Beryl and her work in 2005, and she was also the featured artist in BBC Two's The Culture Show in 2006.

Beryl Cook died on 28 May 2008 at her home in Plymouth. Peninsula Arts of the Plymouth University mounted a major retrospective exhibition in November that year. Two books devoted to her were published: Beryl Cook 1926-2008 and The World of Beryl Cook. In 2010, two of her paintings were used as part of the Rude Britannia exhibition at the Tate Britain. Beryl Cook's paintings have been acquired by the Gallery of Modern Art in Glasgow, Bristol City Museum and Art Gallery, Plymouth Art Gallery and Durham Museum.

Publications
 The Works (John Murray, 1978) (Penguin Books, 1979)
 Private View (John Murray, 1980)
 Seven Years and a Day (with Colette O'Hare) (Collins, 1980)
 One Man Show (John Murray, 1981)
 Bertie and the Big Red Ball (with Edward Lucie-Smith) (John Murray, 1982)
 My Granny Was a Frightful Bore (with Nanette Newman) (Collins, 1983)
 Beryl Cook's New York (John Murray, 1985)
 On the Town (with Edward Lucie-Smith) (Devon Books, 1988)
 Beryl Cook's London (John Murray, 1988)
 Bouncers (Victor Gollancz, 1991)
 Happy Days (Victor Gollancz, 1995)
 Cruising (Victor Gollancz, 2000)
 The Bumper Edition (Victor Gollancz, 2000)

References

External links

 Our Beryl Cook
 

1926 births
2008 deaths
British children's book illustrators
English women painters
Naïve painters
Officers of the Order of the British Empire
People educated at Kendrick School
People from Epsom
Artists from Plymouth, Devon
People from Reading, Berkshire
British women illustrators
20th-century English painters
20th-century English women artists